Francesca Romana D'Antuono (born 29 August 1987) is a European politician from Italy. In October 2021, she was elected co-president of Volt Europa together with Reinier van Lanschot at the 2021 General Assembly.

Career 
D'Antuono was born in Campania and grew up in Rome. She studied pharmacy at the Sapienza University of Rome from 2006 to 2010, followed by studies at the Université de Genève. This was followed by training in marketing, management and healthcare policy in 2014 to 2015. In the following years, D'Antuono worked first for Astra Zeneca in Milan, then for the Menarini Group in Florence, each time as a product or brand manager.

There, from 2019 to 2020, she was Volt Firenze's city coordinator and led Volt Italia's public relations team. Since July 2020, D'Antuono lives in Berlin and works as a manager at Berlin-Chemie.

In October 2021, she was elected Co-President of Volt Europa together with Reinier van Lanschot at the General Assembly.

Political positions

Woman rights 
D'Antuono is advocating for the inclusion and advancement of women in leadership positions and aims for equal political representation. She criticises inequalities in the medical sector, such as the fact that less is known about diseases and the effect of medicines on the female body, that diseases are diagnosed less quickly and that the risk of misdiagnosis or wrong treatment by doctors is higher.

Miniorities 
She criticises rejectionism and calls for social efforts to integrate people with disabilities into society from their early lives and reduce factors for discrimination such as segregation of people with disabilities in schools or accommodation facilities specifically for people, as called for by the UN Committee on the Rights of Persons with Disabilities.

In a series of contributions, D'Antuno criticises the handling of racism and hostility towards the LGBTQ community in Italy. She calls for self-reflection in society and for a critical approach to the own history.

Democracy 
D'Antuono supports the democratisation of the elections to the European Parliament by applying the same electoral system in all member states to ensure equal opportunities and representation within the EU. In the Portuguese parliamentary election in March 2022, together with Van Lanschot and Duarte Costa, the Volt candidate of the European foreign constituency, she addressed the Portuguese President and warned of constitutional problems and a dwindling confidence in the electoral system after massive problems with voting became known. Therefore, they proposed in the letter to reform the electoral system and to examine the possibility of electronic voting in addition to personal voting and postal voting.

European defence policy 
In a guest contribution, she called for the expansion of the Permanent Structured Cooperation (PESCO) and pleaded for a permanent EU armed corps that could be deployed quickly and autonomously in crises. For future missions, obstacles should be removed quickly in order to be able to use existing structures and to find joint responses to crises. She also envisages coalitions of the willing for the establishment of a first permanent EU battle group.

Personal life 
Under the pseudonym Francesca del Mar, D'Antuono wrote several short stories and two books.

References 

Living people
Volt Europa politicians
Italian politicians
Sapienza University of Rome alumni
University of Geneva alumni
1987 births